Kalombo is a given name. Notable people with this given name include:

Kalombo Mwansa (born 1955), Zambian politician 
Kalombo N'Kongolo (1961–1993), Congolese footballer
Kalombo Ndumbu Patrice (born 1984), Russian Internet Entrepreneur, founder of https://kalombo.ru/ - e-commerce company in Russia